Burton Silverman is an American artist.

Education 
Born in Brooklyn, New York, in 1928, Silverman received a BA from Columbia College and studied at the Art Students League and the Pratt Institute. Now entering his sixth decade as an artist, Silverman has also taught at the School of Visual Arts, the Art Students League, the National Academy School of Fine Arts, the Academy of Art University in San Francisco, and Brigham Young University's College of Fine Arts. Silverman was also the Smith Distinguished Visiting Professor at George Washington University in Washington, D.C.

Career
Silverman's work has been included in retrospectives at the Butler Institute of American Art, the Brigham Young Museum of Art, the Sherwin Miller Museum in Tulsa, OK, the Lyme Academy of Fine Arts University, and the Hofstra University Museum. His art has been featured at in group exhibits at the Smithsonian National Portrait Gallery, the Delaware Art Museum, and the Arnot Art Museum. Public collections which host Silverman paintings includes, but is not limited to: the Brooklyn Museum, The Metropolitan Museum of Art, the Butler Institute of American Art, the Denver Art Museum, The Georgia Museum of Art, the Philadelphia Museum of Art, The New Britain Museum, the Mint Museum, the Smithsonian American Art Museum, the Delaware Art Museum, the Columbus Museum, the Arkansas Art Center, the Seven Bridges Foundation in Connecticut, and the Smith Museum of Auburn University also host Silverman paintings. Recently, Silverman has had solo exhibitions at Gallery Henoch in New York City and at the Haynes Galleries in Nashville, TN. Commissioned portraits painted by Silverman have included notable jurists, medical doctors, and educators, from clients such as the University of Chicago, Yale University, Harvard University, Princeton University, and Weill Cornell Medical Center.

Montgomery bus boycott

In 1956, Silverman traveled with fellow artist Harvey Dinnerstein to Montgomery, Alabama, to document the profound social changes taking place after Black activists refused to ride the city's then segregated buses.  During their visit, Dinnerstein and Silverman created more than 90 drawings ranging from courtroom scenes to church meetings to portraits of those who chose, according to the Rev. Martin Luther King Jr. to "walk with dignity rather than ride in humiliation". The drawings they created there were a dramatic reconstruction of this turning point in American culture. The drawings appeared in various solo exhibitions of Silverman's and Dinnerstein's artwork, but as a whole, the entire collection was first shown in 2005 at the Delaware Art Museum and the Montgomery Museum of Fine Art in 2006 an exhibition tilted: "In Glorious Dignity: Drawings of the Montgomery Bus Boycott". As described in the exhibition catalogue, "They traveled to document through their drawings ordinary people engaged in a mighty endeavor, a demonstration of civil disobedience which came to be known as the Montgomery bus boycott. Soon what began as a local phenomenon received widespread national and international attention, serving as a catalyst for the Civil Rights Movement." According to Silverman and Dinnerstein, the boycott was "a struggle that went beyond specific issues of segregation in the buses to larger concerns of inequality across the nation".

Style 
Burton Silverman is considered one of America's most accomplished and important realist painters and illustrators. His draftsmanship, brushwork, composition, use of color, and tonality both owe a debt to and have continued the traditions and standards established by the great representationalist artists throughout history. Realism has made something of a resurgence at the beginning of the 21st century and many in the latest generation cite Silverman's work as inspiration, much as Silverman himself drew upon and advanced upon the works of Rembrandt, Degas, Sargeant, and more. "I have tried to reunite form—both color and composition—with content. the realistic and narrative imagery, to arrive at some kind of synthesis of 20th century formalism with 20th century sensibilities", Silverman has said. "I do not believe that the way paint is applied to a canvas should be more important than what is portrayed." After being discharged from the U.S. Armed Forces, he worked as both gallery artist and illustrator. For the latter, he was election to the Society of Illustrators Hall of Fame in 2001. In addition to illustrations featured in Time magazine, Sports Illustrated, and Esquire, famously, Silverman's watercolor paintings graced Jethro Tull's 1971 album, Aqualung, an iconic image that is still celebrated today. Beginning the early 1990s, Silverman focused on portraiture and refining his style, which ran in opposition to the dictums and tenets of modernist art—in and of itself a radical act. "In view of the many honors he has been accorded, it may seem odd to describe Burton Silverman as an artistic underdog, yet the designation actually fits. Unlike his exact contemporary, the abstract expressionist Cy Twombly, Silverman is neither world famous nor rich. This situation says less about the immense talents of these two men than it does about the state of American art in the 20th century", the art historian Mathias Anderson wrote. According to Dartmouth College Robert C. McGrath, "His art may be seen as a kind of radical realism by virtue of its continuing devotion to a humanist vision that has survived modernist dogma of the 50s as well as the austere impersonal canons of judgment embedded in the 'new realism' of the eighties. For Silverman, form remains inextricably linked to meaning. Asserting itself throughout his painting is the fluid brushwork and natural coloration that informs the eye while eliciting, alchemically, a compassionate understanding of the human condition. In the final analysis, it is Silverman's unflinching vision together with his creative rethinking of tradition that constitutes his most defiant and enduring artistic contribution."

Awards 
He is the recipient of nine awards from the National Academy of Design Museum including two Henry W. Ranger Purchase Awards. He was awarded a Gold medal from the Portrait Society of America 2004, the Annual Distinguished Artist Award from the Newington Cropsey Cultural Foundation, The John Singer Sargent Gold Medal from American Society of Portrait Artist, 2002, Lifetime Achievement Award The FACE Conference, 2018 and an Honorary Doctorate from the Academy of Art University in San Francisco, 2001.

Awards since 1990 
 Face Lifetime Achievement Award
 2020 The Benjamin West Clinedinst Memorial Medal for distinguished achievement in the Arts 
 2018 G&B Marble Medal, American Watercolor Society Exhibition, NYC
 2017 Jury's Selection, The Outwin Boochever Portrait Competition, Smithsonian National Portrait Gallery
 2008 Berkelson Award, the National Academy Museum 181st Exhibition
 2006 Berkelson Award, the National Academy Museum 179th Exhibition
 2005 Newington Cropsey Cultural Center Award for Excellence in the Arts
 2004 Gold Medal Lifetime Award the Portrait Society of America
 2002 Dong Kingman Award, The American Watercolor Society Annual, NYC
 2002 John S. Sargent Gold Medal, American Society of Portrait Artists
 2001 Honorary Doctorate awarded by the Academy of Art College, San Francisco, CA
 1997 Paul and Margaret Berkelson Prize, National Academy of Design, NYC
 1997 Mario Cooper Award, The AWS Annual, NYC
 1996 Clara Stroud Memorial, The AWS, NYC
 1995 The Silver Medal of Honor, the Annual of the American Watercolor Society, NYC
 1994 Clara Stroud Memorial, AWS Annual,  NYC
 1992 The Joseph Isidor Medal, National Academy of Design Annual,  NYC
 1991 The High Winds Medal, AWS Annual NYC
 1991 Smith Distinguished Visiting Professor, the George Washington University, Washington, D.C.
 1991 Elected Hall of Fame, Pastel Society of America
 1990 The Catherine Stroud Memorial Award, AWS Annual,  NYC

Articles
 Burton Silverman, "Burton Silverman on Relevance in Art", Family and Museum Magazine, Winter 2020
 ————, "Degas, an inspiring Messenger from the Past", Fine Art Connoisseur, July–August 2017
 ————, "Getting to Realism from Two Directions", The Artist's Magazine, August 1992
 ————, "What makes Art Great", American Arts Quarterly, Spring 1992
 ————, "Homage to Eakins", Book World, December 1967
 ————, "Art for Pablo Picasso's Sake", Book World, June 1968

Reviews
 Maureen Bloomfield, "In Context: an interview with Burton Silverman", The Artist's Magazine, May 2015
 Maureen Bloomfield, "Masters and Mentors", New Realism, 2016
 Michael Gormley, "Face It; Talking about Portraiture with Burton Silverman", Fine Art Connoisseur, Nov-Dec. 2014
 Austin Williams, "7 Influential Teachers of Our Time", American Artist, Dec. 2012
 Michael Gormley, "Three Painters Visualize the Real World", American Artist, Feb. 2012
 John O'Hern, "Everyday People", American Art Review, Dec. 2011
 Adam Van Doren, "Realism Redux", American Artist, Oct. 2011
 Ira Goldberg, "In search of the Humane", Linea, The Art Student's League, Fall 2011
 Naomi Esperigin, "What Is Genuine? Realist Artists Take on Hard Times", American Artist, 2010
 Tracy Fieldstat, "When Artists take on the Hard Times", Fine Art Connoisseur, Feb. 2010
 Karen York, "Realism Recovered: The Art of Burton Silverman", 2010 exhibition catalog
 Matthias Alexander, "Burton Silverman: Sight and Insight", Fine Art Connoisseur, March-Apr. 2007
 Herman Dutoit, "The Intimate Eye: The Drawings of Burton Silverman", Brigham Young University, 2006
 Mark M Johnson, "Protest in Montgomery", Montgomery Museum of Art, Alabama, introductions to the catalogue, 2006
 Joseph Keiffer, "Burton Silverman", American Arts Quarterly. Spring 1999
 Michael Ward, "Letter From a Guest", The Artist's Magazine, 1991
 Steven Heller, "Review", Arts Magazine, January 1984.
 Charles Offin, "Burton Silverman at Far", Arts Magazine, May 1970
 Brian O'Doherty, "Art: A Return to Old Masters' World", The New York Times, February 2, 1962

Books by Burton Silverman
 Naked: The Nude in America, Dykstra, Bram 2010 
 The Intimate Eye: the Drawings of Burton Silverman, Brigham Young University Press 2006, Herman Dutoit, curator 2006,  
 The Illustrator in America, 1860-2000, Society of Illustrators, Walt Read 2001 
 Sight and Insight: The Art of Burton Silverman, Madison Square Press, NY 1999, featuring essays by John McGrath, Philip Saietta, and Burton Silverman; preface by Campbell Gray, Director, BYU Museum; foreword by Louis Zona, Director, Butler Institute of American Art, 
 Painting People, Watson Guptill, 1977 
 Breaking the Rules of Watercolor, Watson Guptill, NY 1981

Videos
https://www.youtube.com/watch?v=e8M_bxCuUFQ&list=PLVCLsZ8CpgQ_AyxWJWSJ2WK6RY2jz88Ax&index=2
https://www.youtube.com/watch?v=QJzHNMqxS90

References

External links
 

1928 births
Living people
20th-century American painters
American male painters
21st-century American painters
21st-century American male artists
Album-cover and concert-poster artists
The High School of Music & Art alumni
Columbia College (New York) alumni
Artists from Brooklyn
Painters from New York City
Art Students League of New York alumni
Pratt Institute alumni
20th-century American male artists